Barrow is a hamlet and civil parish in Shropshire, England, some 5 miles south of Telford between Ironbridge and Much Wenlock.

Although Barrow itself consists of a church and just a few dwellings, the parish extends from Broseley to the eastern edge of Much Wenlock; it also includes the hamlet of Willey and Benthall. According to the 2001 census the parish had a population of 636, increasing at the 2011 Census to 680.

Barrow is a short distance south of the site of a lost mediaeval village, Arlescott. The Jack Mytton Way runs through both Arlescott and Barrow.

See also
Listed buildings in Barrow, Shropshire

Notes and references

External links

Villages in Shropshire
Civil parishes in Shropshire